Fanari may refer to the following places:

in Greece:
Ano Fanari, a place in the Methana peninsula
Fanari, Elis, part of the municipality of Andritsaina-Krestena in Elis 
Fanari, Karditsa, part of the municipality of Mouzaki in the Karditsa regional unit
Fanari, Preveza, a municipal unit in the Preveza regional unit
Fanari, Rhodope, part of the municipality of Aigeiros in the Rhodope regional unit
Fânari (disambiguation), several places in Romania